The Rio Grande Valley Vipers are an American professional basketball team of the NBA G League based in Edinburg, Texas, and are affiliated with the Houston Rockets. The Vipers play their home games at the Bert Ogden Arena. The Vipers have won four league titles in 2010, 2013, 2019, and 2022, the most for any club in league history, and they also have made the most championship series in league history, having made it six times to the finals. They are also the earliest champion to still play in their original city along with one of only two teams (the other being the Fort Wayne Mad Ants) to have played in every league season since 2007. The Vipers entered a single-partnership affiliation agreement with the Houston Rockets during the 2009–10 season. Previously, they were affiliated with the Cleveland Cavaliers for the 2007–08 season and the New Orleans Hornets from 2007 to 2009.

History
After the finish of the 2006–07 season, the D-League announced an expansion to Hidalgo, Texas, with the team being christened the "Rio Grande Valley Vipers", becoming the 14th team in league history, and they would play at Dodge Arena. In their debut season of 2007–08, they finished with a 21–29 record, failing to qualify for the playoffs. In March 2008, four games before the season ended, inaugural head coach Bob Hoffman announced his resignation, as he decided to pursue a coaching job in college basketball.

The next season, they finished with the same record, failing to advance to the playoffs for the second year in a row. In 2009, the Vipers and the Houston Rockets entered into a single-affiliation partnership in which the Rockets controlled the team's basketball operations, while the business affairs would be handled by owner Alonzo Cantu. On August 18, 2009, the Rockets fired Clay Moser as coach, and named Chris Finch as coach on September 29. The result paid immediate dividends in the 2009–10 season, as the Vipers enjoyed their most successful season. Led by league MVP Mike Harris, and coach of the year in Chris Finch, the Vipers went 34–16 to lead the Western Conference and earned the franchise's first playoff berth. In the playoffs, the Vipers beat both the Reno Bighorns and Austin Toros in three games each to reach the D League Finals. They then met the Tulsa 66ers in the Finals. They won Game 1 on April 25 by a score of 124–107 in Tulsa before returning home for Game 2 on April 27, which had an attendance of 6,198 to see them at the Arena, the most to see a Vipers game in their history. Harris led all scorers with 26 points, but it came down to the buzzer that resulted in a three-point attempt by Craig Winder that went in to provide a 94–91 victory to win the first championship in team history, which was also the first championship for the region since the Edinburg Roadrunners in 2004.

In the 2012-13 season, the Vipers went 35–15 on the heels of a 10-game winning streak to close out the season, and it was second-best among all D-League teams. In the postseason, they beat the Maine Red Claws and the Tulsa 66ers in two-game sweeps to reach the finals for the third time in four seasons. The Vipers faced the Santa Cruz Warriors, doing so in a two-game sweep that had them win Game 1 112–102 on April 25 before winning at home 102–91 on April 27 to win their second league title while also becoming the second team (and first since the 2008-09 playoffs) in the best-of-three era to go undefeated in D-League postseason play. Andrew Goudelock won the NBA Development League Most Valuable Player Award and got called up by the Los Angeles Lakers. In November of that year, the Vipers announced Gianluca Pascucci as the general manager and Nevada Smith as the head coach. Smith's teams received notice for their fast pace and eclectic shooting from the three-point line, continuing a trend set in 2009 (under previous coach Chris Finch) where the Vipers outpaced their NBA counterpart in the Houston Rockets each time, while shooting at a three-point rate higher than them all but once from 2009 to 2014); this reflected the vision of Rockets general manager Daryl Morey in seeing the Vipers as a laboratory for potential strategies to grow in the NBA. The 2013-14 team started on a hot streak, winning their first 9 games of the season; the 10 wins from the previous season combined with the nine here made for a 19-game winning streak, the longest streak in D-League regular-season history. While the Vipers finished 30–20 for a fifth-place finish among all teams, they shot a whopping 2,268 three-point attempts, which averaged to 45 shots a game.

On February 26, 2015, the Vipers broke ground on a new arena in Edinburg called Bert Ogden Arena, which was originally scheduled for completion in October 2016. The arena was reportedly initially designed to house 8,500 seats, along with being a venue used for entertainment. The Vipers would serve as the main tenant and operator (with the City of Edinburg acting as owner of the arena), complete with a 40-by-20 foot jumbotron, the largest in the league. The arena was half-funded by sales taxes to go with private funding that resulted in an initial estimated cost of $68 million. On August 18 of that year, the Vipers named Matt Brase their new head coach.

After a few delays, the new arena was announced to have a grand opening in June 2018, with the Vipers beginning play in the arena for the 2018–19 season, with an end cost of $88 million. The 2017-18 season was the 1th and final season for the team at their original arena (originally known as Dodge Arena before rebranding to State Farm Arena), and they were the longest tenant to ever play in the venue. On April 12, 2019, the Vipers won their third championship in a 129–112 game three win against the Long Island Nets, having rallied from a loss in the first game to win two straight, with Isaiah Hartenstein scoring 30 points in the clinching game to lead the Vipers to victory.

The Vipers have seen two of their coaches become head coaches in the NBA, Nick Nurse and Chris Finch, with the former being the first coach to lead both an NBA and NBA G-League team to championships. On October 1, 2019, assistant coach Mahmoud Abdelfattah was promoted to head coach after Joseph Blair left for an assistant job with the Philadelphia 76ers; Abdelfattah became the first Palestinian and Muslim head coach in NBA/NBA G League history. Travis Stockbridge was named general manager, becoming the youngest general manager in NBA G League history at the age of 25.

In the 2021-22 season, the Vipers became the second team in league history to sweep the major three G League awards: the NBA G League Coach of the Year Award for Mahmoud Abdelfattah (just the second Vipers coach to win the award), NBA G League Most Valuable Player Award for Trevelin Queen (the third Viper to win the award), and the NBA G League Team Executive of the Year Award for general manager Travis Stockbridge (the second Vipers executive to win the award). They reached the postseason for the tenth time in their fifteen season history, becoming the fourth team in league history to reach the postseason ten times; they reached the NBA G League Finals for the sixth time, doing so with victories over the Texas Legends in the Conference Semifinal and the Agua Caliente Clippers in the Conference Final. On April 12, they won 145–128 in Game 1; the points scored by the Vipers was an NBA G League Finals record, and the 44 points scored by Trevelin Queen is second-most in finals history. Daishen Nix (31 points, 12 rebounds, 11 assists) and Anthony Lamb (10 points, 10 rebounds, and 10 assists) each recorded triple-doubles, which is the first occasion of a triple-double since 2013 and the first ever G League Finals game to feature two triple doubles. On April 14, they defeated the Blue Coats 131–114 to win their fourth title.

On February 12, 2023 they reached the 3rd place of the 2023 FIBA Intercontinental Cup.

Season-by-season

Current roster

Head coaches

Past players
See :Category:Rio Grande Valley Vipers players for all players who are notable enough to have articles and have played for the team.

Players assigned from NBA teams
 Steve Novak – assigned by the Houston Rockets on November 11, 2007
 Aaron Brooks – assigned by the Houston Rockets on December 6, 2007
 Cedric Simmons – assigned by the Cleveland Cavaliers on January 2, 2008
 Shannon Brown – assigned by the Cleveland Cavaliers on January 11, 2008
 Joey Dorsey – assigned by the Houston Rockets on December 26, 2008
 Joey Dorsey – assigned by the Houston Rockets on November 13, 2009
 Jermaine Taylor – assigned by the Houston Rockets on January 28, 2010
 Ishmael Smith – assigned by the Houston Rockets on January 17, 2011
 Marcus Morris – assigned by the Houston Rockets on January 2, 2012 & February 3, 2012
 Patrick Beverley – assigned by the Houston Rockets on January 7, 2013
 Isaiah Canaan – assigned by the Houston Rockets on November 7, 2013
 Clint Capela – assigned by the Houston Rockets on November 10, 2014
 Nick Johnson – assigned by the Houston Rockets on November 18, 2014
 K. J. McDaniels – assigned by the Houston Rockets on November 11, 2015
 Montrezl Harrell – assigned by the Houston Rockets on December 6, 2015
 Sam Dekker – assigned by the Houston Rockets on February 19, 2016
 Chinanu Onuaku – assigned by the Houston Rockets on October 31, 2016
 Kyle Wiltjer – assigned by the Houston Rockets on November 13, 2016
 Troy Williams – assigned by the Houston Rockets on March 10, 2017

Players recalled to the NBA
 Aaron Brooks – recalled by the Houston Rockets on December 14, 2007
 Steve Novak – recalled by the Houston Rockets on December 17, 2007
 Cedric Simmons – recalled by the Cleveland Cavaliers on January 11, 2008
 Shannon Brown – recalled by the Cleveland Cavaliers on January 17, 2008
 Marcus Morris - recalled by the Houston Rockets on January 16, 2012 & February 20, 2012
 Patrick Beverley – recalled by the Houston Rockets on January 15, 2013
 Isaiah Canaan – recalled by the Houston Rockets on December 21, 2013
 Nick Johnson – recalled by the Houston Rockets on November 24, 2014
 Clint Capela – recalled by the Houston Rockets on March 27, 2015
 Sam Dekker – recalled by the Houston Rockets on March 5, 2016
 K. J. McDaniels – recalled by the Houston Rockets on March 5, 2016
 Montrezl Harrell – recalled by the Houston Rockets on April 10, 2016
 Chinanu Onuaku – recalled by the Houston Rockets on November 21, 2016
 Kyle Wiltjer – recalled by the Houston Rockets on November 21, 2016

Players called up to the NBA
 C.J. Watson – called up by the Golden State Warriors on January 8, 2008
 Jawad Williams – called up by the Cleveland Cavaliers on April 9, 2009
 Mike Harris – called up by the Houston Rockets on December 23, 2009
 Will Conroy – called up by the Houston Rockets from January 28 to February 8, 2010
 Garrett Temple – called up by the Houston Rockets on February 8, 2010
 Mustafa Shakur – called up by the Washington Wizards, 2011
 Drew Goudelock – called up by the Los Angeles Lakers, 2013
 Jordan Hamilton – called up by the New Orleans Pelicans on March 25, 2016
 Isaiah Taylor – called up by the Houston Rockets on February 27, 2017
 Gary Payton II – called up by the Milwaukee Bucks on April 2, 2017
 Monté Morris – called up by the Denver Nuggets on December 12, 2017

NBA affiliates
 Houston Rockets (2007–present)
 Cleveland Cavaliers (2007–2008)
 New Orleans Hornets (2007–2009)

References

External links

 

 
2007 establishments in Texas
Basketball teams established in 2007
Basketball teams in Texas